A penumbral lunar eclipse took place on Thursday, November 8, 1984, the last of three lunar eclipses in 1984. This subtle penumbral eclipse may have been visible to a skilled observer at maximum eclipse. 90% of the Moon's disc was partially shaded by the Earth (none of it was in total shadow), which caused a gentle shadow gradient across its disc at maximum; the eclipse as a whole lasted 4 hours and 28 minutes.

Visibility

Related eclipses

Eclipses of 1984 
 A penumbral lunar eclipse on May 15.
 An annular solar eclipse on May 30.
 A penumbral lunar eclipse on June 13.
 A penumbral lunar eclipse on November 8.
 A total solar eclipse on November 22.

Lunar year series

Metonic series 

This eclipse is the first of five Metonic cycle lunar eclipses on the same date, November 8–9, each separated by 19 years:

Half-Saros cycle
A lunar eclipse will be preceded and followed by solar eclipses by 9 years and 5.5 days (a half saros). This lunar eclipse is related to two partial solar eclipses of Solar Saros 123.

See also 
List of lunar eclipses
List of 20th-century lunar eclipses

Notes

External links 
 

1984-11
1984 in science
November 1984 events